The Philadelphia Wings are a professional box lacrosse team in the East Division of the National Lacrosse League. The Wings have played at the Wells Fargo Center in Philadelphia, Pennsylvania, since the 2018–2019 season.

History
The Philadelphia Wings were a member of the National Lacrosse League, a professional box lacrosse league in North America starting in 1987. They played at the Spectrum (1987–96) and then at the Wells Fargo Center in Philadelphia, Pennsylvania.

The Wings were one of the four original teams in the Eagle Pro Box Lacrosse League that began play in 1987 and the only team to reclaim its identity from the original 1974–75 National Lacrosse League and also retained the first Philadelphia Wings logo.

The Eagle Pro Box Lacrosse League was renamed the Major Indoor Lacrosse League in 1989, and again to the National Lacrosse League in 1998. They are the only franchise to have played all 24 seasons in the same city. The Wings have the most titles in the combined league history with six total: four North American Cups in the MILL era and two Champion's Cup since the formation of the NLL.

On July 11, 2014, it was announced on the team's website that the Wings would be relocating after 28 years in Philadelphia. On September 19, 2014, it was announced that the team had moved to Uncasville, Connecticut, to be known as the New England Black Wolves and play at the Mohegan Sun Arena.

On September 14, 2017, the NLL awarded an expansion franchise in Philadelphia to owner Comcast Spectacor. The franchise fee for Philadelphia and fellow expansion team San Diego Seals was a reported $5 million. On November 29, 2017, it was announced the new franchise would use the "Wings" name to create the notion that the Wings had "returned" to Philadelphia. The Wings played their first game on December 15, 2018 in a loss against the Buffalo Bandits, 17–15.

Fan support and traditions 
Philadelphia fans were known for their passionate support of their team, and the less-than-hospitable treatment of opposing players. In a poll of the players, over 62% stated that Wings fans had screamed the filthiest and nastiest things at them in the league.

Of the fans, goaltender Rob Blasdell said "They truly are the best fans in the league. They're probably the most knowledgeable fans in the league. It would kind of be the same as playing for the Leafs in Toronto. They're very, very passionate." Philadelphia fans enjoy the physical aspect of the game, leading Geoff Snider to comment: "The Philly fans are great. They are very loyal and they get behind it. I got a standing ovation once for a roughing penalty. I'd never seen anything like that before."

Fans traditions started from the national anthem, when fans could be heard making a 'tsch' sound at the end of each line, mocking a recording that was used by the Wings in the early years where the only audible portion of the song was the cymbal crashes. During the introductions of the opposing team, each player's name was followed by a call of "sucks", a tradition that has been extended to the opposing coaches, trainers, and the game officials. The local shot clock operator had escaped the jeering, and was instead cheered.

During the game, the opposing goalie was often the target of fans' heckling. The most common chant was to remind the goalies "It's all your fault" after every goal they allow. If there is a cheap shot fans are known to chant "asshole asshole"

One of the more notable traditions was the dueling "W-I-N-G-S" cheers. The side of the arena with the penalty boxes had long been led by "Chopper", a Wings superfan with face paint and a hard hat, well known around the league making opposing players who find their way to the penalty box regret their time there. He has gotten into verbal fights with stars like Shawn Evans. The bench side went through many leaders, from "Big Gabe" and the little gabesters (consisting of Matt Denker, Joshua Gross, Jordan Elsas, Adam David and Eli Goldstein) (father of Scott Gabrielson, a Wings captain in the 1990s) to "Big E" to Chasmo, and now "The Captain" and "Morpheus" or as he made himself known as during the second half of the game on February 29, 2008, "Doctor Lacrosse". The "kick butt baby" (Eric Kulb Martinez) was the biggest little fan even though he could barely talk. While the leader of the chants aren't always the same from year to year, the "W-I-N-G-S WINGS!" cheer did not die out at all, and is still present following the team's revival.

Roster

All-time record

Playoff results

Awards and honors

Head coaching history

Draft history

NLL Entry Draft 
First Round Selections

 2018: Chris Cloutier (2nd overall)
 2019: None
 2020: Jackson Suboch (16th overall)
 2021: Hunter Lemieux (15th overall)
 2022: Taggart Clark (23rd overall)

References

External links
Official Website

National Lacrosse League teams
Sports teams in Philadelphia
Lacrosse clubs established in 2017
2017 establishments in Pennsylvania
Lacrosse teams in Pennsylvania